Camber angle is one of the angles made by the wheels of a vehicle; specifically, it is the angle between the vertical axis of a wheel and the vertical axis of the vehicle when viewed from the front or rear. It is used in the design of steering and suspension. If the top of the wheel is farther out than the bottom (that is, tilted away from the axle), it is called positive camber; if the bottom of the wheel is farther out than the top, it is called negative camber.

Effect on handling 

Camber angle alters the handling qualities of some suspension designs; in particular, negative camber improves grip in corners especially with a short long arms suspension. This is because it places the tire at a better angle to the road, transmitting the centrifugal forces through the vertical plane of the tire rather than through a shear force across it. The centrifugal (outwards) force is compensated for by applying negative camber, which turns the contact surface of the tire outwards to match, maximizing the contact patch area. Note that this is only true for the outside tire during the turn; the inside tire would benefit most from positive camber again, only with a short long arms system. However, due to the weight transfer inherent while turning, the outside wheels bear more of the force of turning and negative camber will improve handling overall. Caster angle will also compensate for this to a degree, as the top of the outside tire will tilt slightly inward, and the inner tire will respectively tilt outward. However, any camber affects the contact patch of the tire while driving in a straight line. Zero camber gives the best traction as it maximises the contact patch between the road and the tires and puts the tire tread flat on the road. Therefore excessive camber impairs straight driving in rain and snow and when accelerating hard.  

Proper management of camber angle is a major factor in suspension design, and must incorporate not only idealized geometric models, but also real-life behavior of the components; flex, distortion, elasticity, etc. What was once an art has become much more scientific with the use of computers, which can optimize all of the variables mathematically instead of relying on the designer's intuition and experience. As a result, the handling of even low-priced automobiles has improved dramatically. Heavy-duty vehicles, such as tractors, trucks, etc., tend to have more positive camber angle, so that when they are loaded and the whole vehicle lowers, the wheels are almost vertical.

Adjustability 
In cars with double wishbone suspensions, camber angle may be fixed or adjustable, but in MacPherson strut suspensions, it is normally fixed. The elimination of an available camber adjustment may reduce maintenance requirements, but if the car is lowered by use of shortened springs, the camber angle will change.  Excessive camber angle can lead to increased tire wear and impaired handling.  Significant suspension modifications may correspondingly require that the upper control arm or strut mounting points be altered to allow for some inward or outward movement, relative to the longitudinal centerline of the vehicle, for camber adjustment. With aftermarket plates containing slots for strut mounts instead of merely holes, this allows the entire shock absorber to be able to move back and forth, allowing for fine-tuning the camber of a vehicle. These plates are available for most of the commonly modified models of cars. Some aftermarket coilovers come with built-in camber plates already in place, and there are certain other aftermarket solutions which allow the modification of the camber angle of the wheels. Camber bolts with eccentrics allow adjustable camber on some vehicles. These bolts feature large washers that are either eccentric or offset. If the original-equipment bolts are replaced with eccentric ones, then the adjustment will engender a change of up to two degrees. Control arms (or A-arms) with adjustable ball joints represent another avenue for allowing side-by-side adjustability. With these control arms installed, tire camber can effectively be changed by simply moving the tires. After that, one tightens the bolts in order to lock the ball joint in the desired position. Yet another aftermarket solution for changing the camber angle is via control rods of adjustable length. However, this solution is only amenable to vehicles which employ control rods, not A-arms. Because control rods (in vehicles so equipped) are responsible for locating the suspension points and keeping them in place, changing the overall length of the rods influences the camber angle.

Camber in uneven terrain 

Off-road vehicles such as agricultural tractors generally use positive camber. In such vehicles, the positive camber angle helps achieve a lower steering effort.  Also, some single-engined general-aviation aircraft that are primarily meant to operate from unimproved surfaces, such as bush planes and cropdusters, have their taildragger gear's main wheels equipped with positive-cambered main wheels to better handle the deflection of the landing gear, as the aircraft settles on rough, unpaved airstrips.

Camber wear 
Whenever enough positive or negative camber is applied, the car's tires will wear unevenly. This uneven tire-wear caused by camber is known as camber wear. A car with enough negative camber will, for the most part, be putting more load on the inside of a car's tire, causing the inside of the tire to wear out quicker than the outside. However, a little bit of negative camber actually has the opposite effect and slightly improves tire wear, as during turns the car's weight shifts toward the outside of the outer wheel. On a car with zero camber, this puts most of the load on the outside of the tire, causing uneven wear over time. Enough positive camber will usually put more load on the outside of the tire, causing the outside to wear out quicker. This is one of the main reasons cars do not come with a lot of positive or negative camber from the factory.

Stance cars 

Negative camber was primarily used in motor sports due to the traction increase around turns. However, it eventually became popular to use negative camber in order to be able to lower a car and fit wheels on it which would not normally fit in the fender wells. Cars with these modifications eventually were given the name "stance cars". It is difficult to pinpoint when exactly this trend began, although it became mainstream in the 1970s with the Bosozoku cars coming out of Japan. This trend began with the intent of making street cars look more like race cars by lowering their suspension and adding a little negative camber. As time went by, such cars were being customarily lowered more and more, as well as having much more negative camber than before. While the stance-car culture has become very popular, it is also somewhat controversial, since the large amounts of negative camber and the small amount of ground clearance such cars are customized to have makes them very unpractical. Cars with extreme camber are occasionally the subject of ridicule by other car enthusiasts, with videos of these cars getting stuck on speed bumps being circulated.

Notes 
1.While nearly all automobiles now use "negative camber" on all four wheels, this convention dates from a time period when positive camber was more common.

See also
 Camber thrust
 Caster angle
 Kingpin (automotive part)
 Toe (automotive)
 Vehicle dynamics

References

External links 
Camber and Race Car Suspension Tuning
Camber, Caster, Toe - What does it all mean?
Suspension 101 - Camber, Caster, and Toe
[Ryan. (2014, August 6). Culture: Stance, fitment & USDM car scene. THE. Retrieved September 21, 2022, from https://www.the-lowdown.com/stance-fitment-usdm-car-culture/?v=322b26af01d5]
[Harbid, T. (2020, September 4). Negative camber what is it and why does it happen? . Cash Cars Buyer. Retrieved September 21, 2022, from https://www.cashcarsbuyer.com/negative-camber/]
[Sabella, M. D. I. (2014, August 9). Camber 101, everything you need to know - tech - honda tuning magazine. MotorTrend. Retrieved September 21, 2022, from https://www.motortrend.com/how-to/htup-0712-camber-101-honda-camber-guide/]

Automotive steering technologies
Tires